Samart Panya ((born 7 October 1985), is a Thai professional footballer who plays as a centre back for Thai League 3 club Saraburi United.

External links
 

1985 births
Living people
Samart Panya
Association football defenders
Samart Panya
Samart Panya
Samart Panya
Samart Panya